Shikamori Dam is a gravity dam located in Ehime Prefecture in Japan. The dam is used for flood control, irrigation and power production. The catchment area of the dam is 51.1 km2. The dam impounds about 8  ha of land when full and can store 1590 thousand cubic meters of water. The construction of the dam was started on 1958 and completed in 1962.

References

Dams in Ehime Prefecture
1962 establishments in Japan